Star Trek: The Role Playing Game Game Master's Screen is a 1983 role-playing game supplement for Star Trek: The Role Playing Game published by FASA.

Contents
Star Trek: The Role Playing Game Game Master's Screen compiled all of the information from the Basic Rules, Trader/Merchant expansion, and Klingon expansion into one booklet and one three-panel screen.

Game Master's Screen is a GM's screen for 1st-ed. rules, with a booklet of play-aids and character sheets.

Publication history
Game Master's Screen was published by FASA Corp. in 1984 as a cardstock screen with a 16-page pamphlet.

Reception
Frederick Paul Kiesche III reviewed Star Trek: The Role Playing Game Gamemaster's Screen in Space Gamer No. 68. Kiesche commented that "I would recommend this product to those who play or referee ST:TRPG. Any problems that you may find could be fixed with a little effort on your own part."

References

Gamemaster's screens
Role-playing game supplements introduced in 1983
Star Trek: The Role Playing Game supplements